Eriplatymetra is a genus of moths in the family Geometridae erected by Augustus Radcliffe Grote in 1873.

Species
 Eriplatymetra coloradaria (Grote & Robinson, 1867)
 Eriplatymetra grotearia (Packard, 1876)
 Eriplatymetra lentifluata Barnes & McDunnough, 1917

References

Ourapterygini